The Roca Formation is a Cretaceous to Paleogene lithostratigraphic unit, located in the Neuquén Basin. It crops out in the Argentinian provinces of Río Negro, Neuquén, La Pampa, and Mendoza. Its deposition is diachronous, beginning during the Maastrichtian in the north of its distribution, and later moving to the south, where its strata reached the Late Danian. It lies transitionally above the Jagüel Formation, and the top of the formation is marked by a regional unconformity due to an Eocene and Oligocene orogenic pulse. These two units belong to the Malargüe Group. The marine sediments of the Jagüel and Roca Formations were deposited during a transgression  from the Atlantic Ocean, beginning in the Maastrichtian and ending in the Danian.

The fossiliferous beds of the Roca Formation were discovered by G. Rohde Windhausen  (1914), who was also the first author to describe these sediments. Schiller (1922) took samples of one section along the Zanjón Roca, from the northern part of General Roca to Horno de Cal (lime kiln). This author proposed to name the lime kiln as the "classic area", and the westward cliffs from the lime kiln as the "model area" of these beds. The lithological composition of this type locality contains gray-yellowish and highly fossiliferous limestones, with greenish claystones and marls, and abundant gypsum at the top.

Lithology 
In its type locality, the Roca Formation is divided into three sections. It consists of intercalated bioclastic limestones and green claystones. The calcareous materials are highly fossiliferous with textures like wackestone and packstone without an obvious orientation of the shells. The claystones are composed of montmorillonite with calcite and quartz. Such section has very thin strata of varied yellow limestones and siltstones, interbedded with yellow porous and coarse-grained limestones. The limestones of the middle section are almost devoid of fossil invertebrates. It is mainly composed of white gypsum in large crystals. It has lenticular intercalations of greenish siltstones with wave-formed ripples and fragments of gypsum.

The faunal character on the fossils of marine invertebrates in the Roca Formation suggests a transgression from the Atlantic Ocean. By contrast, the marine invasions in Argentina and Chile during the Jurassic and Early Cretaceous were caused by an inflow of seawater from the Pacific Ocean.

Fossil content 

The first section of the Roca Formation has abundant fossiliferous content, including bivalves, gastropods, bryozoans, echinoderms, crustaceans, ostracods, foraminifera, and calcareous nanoplankton, as well as remains of fish.

Bivalves 

 Pycnodonte (Phygraea) burckhardti (Boehm)
 Pycnodonte (Phygraea) sarmientoi Casadío 1998
 Gryphaeostrea callophyla (Ihering)
 Ostrea wilckensi Ihering
 Ostrea neuquena Ihering
 Cubitostrea ameghinoi (Ihering)
 Nucula (Leionucula) dynastes Ihering
 Neilo cf. N. ornata (Sowerby)
 Cucullaea rocana Ihering
 Chlamys patagonensis negroina Ihering
 Musculus rionegrensis (Ihering)
 Arca ameghinorum Ihering (=Venericardia ameghinorum)
 Venericardia iheringi (Boehm)
 V. feruglioi Petersen
 Aphrodina burckhardti (Ihering)

Gastropods 
 "Aporrhais" spp.
 Turritella burckhardti Ihering
 Turritella aff. T. malaspina Ihering

Nautoloids 
 Hercoglossa romeroi (Ihering)
 Cimomia camachoi Masiuk

Decapods 
 Callianassa burckhardti Boehm

Echinoida 
 Linthia joannisboehmi Oppenheim
 Nucleopygus salgadoi Parm

References 

Geologic formations of Argentina
Malargüe Group
Maastrichtian Stage of South America
Cretaceous Argentina
Cretaceous–Paleogene boundary
Paleocene Series of South America
Danian Stage
Paleogene Argentina
Limestone formations
Siltstone formations
Shale formations
Shallow marine deposits
Paleontology in Argentina